Aigues-Mortes is a commune in the Gard department in the Occitania region of southern France.  The medieval city walls surrounding the city are well preserved. Situated on the junction of the Canal du Rhône à Sète and the Chenal Maritime to Le Grau-du-Roi, the town is a transit center for canal craft and Dutch barges.

Toponymy 
The name "Aigues-Mortes" was attested  in 1248 in the Latinized form , which means "dead water", or "stagnant water".  The name comes from the marshes and ponds that surround the village (which has never had potable water). The inhabitants of the commune are known as Aigues-Mortais or Aigues-Mortaises.

The Occitan  is equivalent to toponymic types in the Morteau Oil dialect cf. Morteau (Doubs): mortua Aqua (1105, VTF521) and Morteaue (Haute-Marne): mortua Aqua (1163, VTF521).  in French means "pond of the King". In Occitan,  means "pond with extension".

History

Antiquity
The Roman general Gaius Marius is said to have founded Aigues-Mortes around 102 BC, but there is no documentary evidence to support this.

A Roman by the name of Peccius cultivated the first salt marsh and gave his name to the Marsh of Peccais. Salt mining started from the Neolithic period and was continued in the Hellenistic period, but the ancient uses of saline have not resulted in any major archaeological discovery. It is likely that any remains were destroyed by modern saline facilities.

Middle Ages

In 791, Charlemagne erected the  amid the swamps for the safety of fishermen and salt workers.

The purpose of this tower was part of the war plan and spiritual plan which Charlemagne granted at the Benedictine abbey, dedicated to Opus Dei (work of God) and whose incessant chanting, day and night, was to designate the convent as Psalmody or Psalmodi. This monastery still existed in 812, as confirmed by an act of endowment made by the Badila from Nîmes at the abbey.

At that time, the people lived in reed huts and made their living from fishing, hunting, and salt production from several small salt marshes along the sea shore. The region was then under the rule of the monks from the Abbey of Psalmody.

In 1240, Louis IX, who wanted to get rid of the dependency on the Italian maritime republics for transporting troops to the Crusades, focused on the strategic position of his kingdom. At that time, Marseille belonged to his brother Charles of Anjou, King of Naples, Agde to the Count of Toulouse, and Montpellier to the King of Aragon. Louis IX wanted direct access to the Mediterranean Sea. He obtained the town and the surrounding lands by exchange of properties with the monks of the abbey. Residents were exempt from the salt tax which was previously levied so that they could now take the salt unconstrained.

In 1272, his son and successor, Philip III the Bold, ordered the continuation of the construction of walls to completely encircle the small town. The work would not be completed for another 30 years.

This was the city from which Louis IX twice departed for the Seventh Crusade in 1248 and for the Eighth Crusade in 1270, where he died of dysentery at Tunis.

The year 1270 has been established, mistakenly for many historians, as the last step of a process initiated at the end of the 11th century. The judgment is hasty because the transfer of crusaders or mercenaries from the harbour of Aigues-Mortes continued after this year. The order given in 1275 to Sir Guillaume de Roussillon by Philip III the Bold and Pope Gregory X after the Council of Lyons in 1274 to reinforce Saint-Jean d'Acre in the East shows that maritime activity continued for a ninth crusade which never took place.

There is a popular belief that the sea reached Aigues-Mortes in 1270. In fact, as confirmed by studies of the engineer Charles Leon Dombre, the whole of Aigues-Mortes, including the port itself, was in the Marette pond, the Canal-Viel and Grau Louis, the Canal Viel being the access channel to the sea. The Grau-Louis was approximately at the modern location of La Grande-Motte.

At the beginning of the 14th century, Philip the Fair used the fortified site to incarcerate the Templars. Between 8 and 11 November 1307, forty-five of them were put to the question, found guilty, and held prisoner in the Tower of Constance.

Modern and contemporary periods
Aigues-Mortes still retained its privileges granted by the kings. The Protestant Jean d'Harambure "the One-Eyed", light horse commander of King Henry IV and former governor of Vendôme was appointed governor of Aigues-Mortes and the Carbonnière Tower on 4 September 1607. To do this, he took an oath before the Constable of France Henri de Montmorency, Governor of Languedoc, who was a Catholic and supported the rival Adrien de Chanmont, the Lord of Berichère. The conflict continued until 1612, and Harambure, supported by the pastors of Lower Languedoc and the inhabitants, finished it by a personal appeal to the Queen. He eventually resigned on 27 February 1615 in favour of his son Jean d'Harambure, but King Louis XIII restored him for six years. On 27 July 1616 he resigned again in favour of Gaspard III de Coligny, but not without obtaining a token of appreciation for the judges and consuls of the city.

At the beginning of the 15th century, important works were being undertaken to facilitate access to Aigues-Mortes from the sea. The old Grau-Louis, dug for the Crusades, was replaced by the Grau-de-la-Croisette and a port was dug at the base of the Tower of Constance. It lost its importance from 1481 when Provence and Marseille were attached to the kingdom of France. Only the exploitation of the Peccais salt marshes encouraged François I, in 1532, to connect the salt industry of Aigues-Mortes to the sea. This channel, called Grau-Henry, silted up in turn. The opening, in 1752, of the Grau-du-Roi solved the problem for a while. A final solution was found in 1806 by connecting the Aigues-Mortes river port through the Canal du Rhône à Sète.

From 1575 to 1622, Aigues-Mortes was one of the eight safe havens granted to the Protestants. The revocation of the Edict of Nantes in 1685 caused severe repression of Protestantism, which was marked in Languedoc and the Cévennes in the early 18th century by the Camisard War. Like other towers in the town, from 1686 onwards, the Constance Tower was used as a prison for the Huguenots who refused to convert to Roman Catholicism. In 1703, Abraham Mazel, leader of the Camisards, managed to escape with sixteen companions.

During the French Revolution, the city was called Port-Pelletier. At that time the port had almost disappeared due to silting, induced by the intensification of labour in the watershed at the same time as the clearing of woods and forests following the abolition of privileges. The decline of forest cover led to soil erosion and consequently a greater quantity of alluvial deposits in the ports of the region. Thus, in 1804 the prefect "Mr. de Barante père" wrote in a report that: "The coasts of this department are more prone to silting ... The ports of Maguelonne and Aigues Mortes and the old port of Cette no longer exist except in history" he alerted: "An inordinate desire to collect and multiply these forest clearings since 1790 ... Greed has devoured in a few years the resource of the future, the mountains, opened to the plough, show that soon naked and barren rock, each groove becoming a ravine; the topsoil, driven by storms, has been brought into the rivers, and thence into the lower parts, where it serves every day to find the lowest parts and the darkest swamps."

The massacre of Italians (August 1893)

The Massacre of the Italians at Aigues-Mortes was a series of events on 16 and 17 August 1893  which resulted in the deaths of immigrant Italian workers of the Compagnie des Salins du Midi, at the hands of French villagers and labourers. Estimates range from the official number of eight deaths up to 150, according to the Italian press of the time. The case was also one of the greatest legal scandals of the time, since no convictions were ever made.

Geography
Access to the commune is by route D979 coming south from Saint-Laurent-d'Aigouze to Aigues-Mortes town. Route D979 continues southwest through the commune to Le Grau-du-Roi. Route D62 also starts from Aigues-Mortes heading southwest parallel to D979 before turning eastwards and forming part of the southern border of the commune. Route D62A continues to Plan d'Eau du Vidourie.

The commune is composed of a portion of the wet plains and lakes of the Petite Camargue. It is separated from the Gulf of Lions (and, thus, the Mediterranean) by the town of Le Grau-du-Roi, however Aigues-Mortes is connected to the sea through the Canal du Rhône à Sète. There is only one other hamlet in the commune called Mas de Jarras Listel on the western border.

The Canal du Rhône à Sète enters the commune from the northwest and the northeast in two branches from the main canal to the north and the branches intersect in the town of Aigues-Mortes before exiting as a single canal alongside route D979 and feeding into the Mediterranean Sea at Le Grau-du-Roi.

A rail branch line from Nîmes passes through Aigues-Mortes from north-east to south-west, with a station in the town of Aigues-Mortes, to its terminus on the coast at Le-Grau-du-Roi.  This line also transports sea salt.

The communes of Saint-Laurent-d'Aigouze and Le Grau-du-Roi are adjacent to the town of Aigues-Mortes.

Climate

Aigues-Mortes has a hot-summer Mediterranean climate (Köppen climate classification Csa).

Heraldry

Economy

Agriculture

Viticulture and asparagus
Breeding of bulls and of Camargue horses. Both are raised almost wild in the surrounding marshes.
The Camargue bull is smaller than the Spanish fighting bulls, stocky, with high horns and head. It measures about 1.40 m at the withers. It is primarily intended for bullfighting which is very popular in the region.
The Camargue horse is the ultimate companion for herdsmen to move into the marshes and herd bulls. According to some discoveries of bones, it seems that the ancestors of the Camargue horse date to the Quaternary period. The Camargue horse is not very large, about 1.50 m tall. It has a huge resistance adapted to the terrain. Its colour is brown at birth, gradually turning white after a few years.

Industries

Production of salt by the operation of the saltworks of the Salins group. Probably used since ancient times, the salt of Aigues-Mortes attracted fishermen and salt workers. The Benedictine monks settled nearby in the 8th century at the Abbey of Psalmodiet to exploit this valuable commodity in the Peccais Ponds. The salt has long been one of the main resources of the city. To achieve "table salt quality", water pumped from the sea travels more than 70 km in "roubines". The concentration of sodium chloride is from 29 to more than 260 g/kg. Mechanically harvested salt is piled up in the twinkling "camelles" before being packaged. It is suitable for human consumption.

Tourism
The medieval heritage from the 13th and 14th centuries of the commune and its proximity to the sea attract many tourists and residents of France.

Transport

River
The city of Aigues-Mortes is a crossroads of canals:
Canal du Rhône à Sète from the north-east and leaving westward
Canal de Bourgidou to the southeast, and joins the Petit Rhône via other channels to the limit of Gard and Bouches-du-Rhône
Le Grau-du-Roi, maintained since the Middle Ages and connecting Aigues-Mortes to the central part of Grau-du-Roi

Railway
Aigues-Mortes station has rail connections to Nîmes and Le Grau-du-Roi. The railway line from Nîmes to Le Grau-du-Roi is also used for the transport of salt produced by the saltworks of the Salins Group (see link below).

Road
The development of seaside tourism since the 1960s was marked by the construction of new resorts (La Grande-Motte) and the extension of existing facilities from Le Grau du Roi to Port-Camargue. To facilitate access to tourists, a coastal road network has been augmented and connected to the A9 motorway. Aigues-Mortes benefits in these ways:
to the east, the road D58 connects the city to Saintes-Maries-de-la-Mer and the commune of Arles. This road winds through the rice fields and the various ponds that make up the Camargue.
to the west, the road D62 was enlarged for cars to make a quick connection to Montpellier
to the north, the road D979 directly connects the town to the motorway at Gallargues-le-Montueux

The bus 106 also connects Montpellier and Saintes-Maries-de-la-Mer.

Administration

Municipal administration

The municipal council consists of 29 members including the mayor, 8 deputies, and 20 municipal councilors.

Since the last municipal elections, its composition is as follows:

List of Successive Mayors of Aigues-Mortes

Mayors from 1944

Canton
The town is the capital of the canton of the same name whose general councillor is Leopold Rosso, deputy mayor of Le Grau-du-Roi and president of the Community of Communes Terre de Camargue (UMP). The canton is part of the arrondissement of Nîmes and the second electoral district of Gard where the member is Gilbert Collard (FN ).

Population

Age distribution
The population of the town is similar to the departmental average. The female population is over-represented compared to men: the rate (52.2%) is substantially the same as the departmental rate (51.8%).

Percentage Distribution of Age Groups in Aigues-Mortes and Gard Department in 2017

Source: INSEE

Local culture

The Aigues-Mortes Fougasse
Fougasse was one of the first pastries which could rise. It can be sweet (sometimes called "tarte au sucre" or sugar tart) or salty (with or without gratillons).

Traditionally, making sweet fougasse in Aigues-Mortes was reserved for the Christmas period, as part of the Thirteen desserts. Based on a brioche dough, sugar, butter, and orange blossom, it was made by the baker with ingredients provided by the client. Now Aigues-Mortes fougasse sells all year.

Lou Drapé
Lou Drapé is an imaginary horse mentioned in local folklore, which was supposed to walk at night around the ramparts of the city and take 50 to 100 children on his back, and disappear to "nowhere".

Historical sites 
Aigues-Mortes has a very large number of sites registered as historical monuments and historical objects.

The Tower of Constance and the ramparts 

The Tower of Constance was built in 1242 by Saint-Louis on the former site of the Matafère Tower which was built by Charlemagne around 790AD to house the king's garrison. The construction was completed in 1254.

It is 22 metres in diameter with a height of either 33 or 40 metres depending on the source. The thickness of the walls at the base is 6 metres.

On the ground floor, there is a guardroom protected by a portcullis. In the middle of the room, there is a circular opening leading to the cellar which served as a pantry, storage of ammunition as well as for dungeons. These areas were called the "culs de basse fosse", an old way of saying underground dungeons in French.

On the first floor, there is the knight's hall. Structurally it is similar to the guardroom. It was in this room that the Protestants were imprisoned during the 18th century, most notably Marie Durand, who engraved the word "résister" (English: resist) into the edge of the well which can be seen to this day. She was imprisoned at the age of 15, and was freed 38 years later, along with political prisoners such as Abraham Mazel, leader of the Camisards.

Between these two rooms, a narrow, covered way was built within the walls to keep watch on the room below.

After the knight's hall, there is an entrance to the terrace which offers a wide panoramic view of the region, making it an ideal position for surveillance.  Sometimes, the prisoners were allowed to go on the terrace to get some fresh air.

The ramparts stretch for a distance of 1650 metres.
Spectacular in their height and their state of preservation even though they were not restored in the 19th century, as was Carcassonne for example, they remain in a well preserved state. Along with the Tower of Constance, they are a testimony to Western European military architecture in the marshlands during the 13th and 14th centuries.

The Carbonnière Tower

Located in the commune of Saint-Laurent-d'Aigouze, the Carbonnière Tower was first referred to in an old text from 1346 specifying the function of the structure. It said, "this fortress is the key to the kingdom in this region." Surrounded by salt marshes, the fortress was the only passageway into Aigues-Mortes. It was guarded by a garrison made up of a châtelain and several guards. From the terrace, which could support up to four cannons, there is a panoramic view of Petite Camargue.

The Church of Notre-Dame-des-Sablons 
The Church of Notre-Dame-des-Sablons is a Gothic-style church and was probably built before the ramparts in the mid-13th century during the time of Saint-Louis. In 1537 it served as a Collegiate church but was later vandalized by Protestants in 1575. After the reconstruction of the bell tower in 1634 it later served as a Temple of Reason during the French Revolution, a barracks, grain merchant, and a salt warehouse. It was re-established as a place of worship in 1804 and the building was restored in the neo classical-baroque style. Between 1964 and 1967 all of the 19th century decor was removed, notably the coffered ceilings, resulting in the much more basic and medieval style church we see today. Since 1991, the stained-glass windows by Claude Viallat, a contemporary artist belonging to the Supports/Surfaces art movement, add extraordinary light and colour to the building.  With the exception of a few statues, the rest of the 18th and 19th century furniture disappeared during this period. The façade is crowned by a simple bell-gable housing 3 bells. The largest of the three is 1.07 metres in diameter. It was dated to 1740, cast by master smelter Jean Poutingon, and has been designated a historical monument of France. The church also houses a statue of Saint-Louis.

The Chapel of the Gray Penitents
The Chapel of the Gray Penitents is located to the east of the Place de la Viguerie. It is the property of the Brotherhood of Grey Penitents established in 1400. The facade is in the style of Louis XIV. The entrance door is from the 17th century and is decorated with a wooden statue. The altarpiece was carved in 1687 by Sabatier.

Inside, an altarpiece represents the passion of Christ. It was built of gray stucco plaster in 1687 by the sculptor Sabatier from Montpellier. This altar, on which are the arms of the brotherhood, occupies the back of the choir.

The Chapel of the White Penitents
The Chapel of the White Penitents is located at the corner of the Rue de la République and Rue Louis Blanc. It belongs to the Brotherhood of the White Penitents which was created in 1622.

Above the choir, on the roof, there is a copy of the Retable of Jerusalem where Christ celebrated the Passover and Holy Thursday with his apostles. Around the high altar, a painting on canvas traces the descent of the Holy Spirit on the day of Pentecost. It is attributed to Xavier Sigalon a painter born in Uzès in 1778 . On each side of the choir stand two statues: on the left Saint Felix for the redemption of captives, on the right James, son of Alphaeus, first Bishop of Jerusalem.

Saint-Louis Square

This is the touristic heart of the city. In the centre, opposite the main entrance of the Porte de la Gardette, stands the statue of Saint-Louis, the work of James Pradier in 1849.

Plan des Theatres
The Plan des Theatres are arenas for the Camargue bullfights. They were listed in 1993 on the inventory of the list of Historic Monuments (MH) for their ethnological and cultural interest. They can accommodate more than 600 people.

Aerial views

In popular culture

Literary references
Ernest Hemingway's third major posthumous work, the novel The Garden of Eden, takes place in Aigues-Mortes.
Wayne Koestenbaum set his 2004 novel Moira Orfei in Aigues-Mortes in Aigues Mortes.
Michael Moorcock's Hawkmoon novels feature Aigues Mortes as the site of Castle Brass and capital city of a futuristic "Kamarg".
Giovanni Boccaccio's The Decameron, Second Day, Seventh Story, as the place the king's daughter was shipwrecked in her false explanation of her four-year absence.

Architectural references
The unique layout of the University of California, Santa Cruz was directly inspired by the layout of Aigues-Mortes, according to UC President Clark Kerr.

Notable people linked to the commune
Louis IX, Saint, and King of France
Maurice Barrès, writer, wrote Le Jardin de Bérénice, which partly takes place in Aigues-Mortes.
Frédéric Bazille, one of the founders of Impressionism, represented Aigues-Mortes in one of his paintings.
Antoine Bigot, writer and translator, wrote the version of La complainte des prisonnières de la tour de Constance in Languedocien.
André Chamson, writer, wrote Tour de Constance.
Alexandre Dumas, writer, recounts his passage in Aigues-Mortes in his book Impression de voyage dans le Midi de la France.
Maurice Fontaine, senator and mayor.
, tenor, born in Aigues-Mortes on 11 January 1876.
Ernest Hemingway, American author and journalist, came to Aigues-Mortes several times when he went to watch corridas in Nîmes.
T. E. Lawrence, British army officer and writer, came to Aigues-Mortes in 1908.
Michel Mézy, former footballer, born in Aigues-Mortes on 15 August 1948.
Emmanuel Théaulon, playwright, born in Aigues-Mortes on 14 August 1787.

Gallery

See also
Communes of the Gard department
 List of works by James Pradier Statue of Saint Louis
 Principality of Aigues-Mortes

References

Bibliography
 Frédéric Simien, Aigues-Mortes, éditions Alan Sutton, 2006. 
 Frédéric Simien, Aigues-Mortes, tome II, éditions Alan Sutton, 2007. 
 Frédéric Simien, Aigues-Mortes, tome III, éditions Alan Sutton, 2011. 
 Frédéric Simien, Camargue, fille du Rhône et de la mer, éditions Alan Sutton, 2010.
 Sur les événements de 1893, Enzo Barnabà, Le sang des marais, Marseille, 1993
 Gérard Noiriel, Le massacre des Italiens d'Aigues-Mortes, Fayard, 2010 
 Christian Rollat,  L'Affaire Roussillon dans la Tragédie Templière , Rollat 2006. 
 Luc Martin, L'été de la Colère - la tragédie d'Aigues-Mortes - Août 1893 [éditions Grau-Mots 2012] 
 Pierre Racine, Mission impossible ? L'aménagement touristique du littoral du Languedoc-Roussillon, éditions Midi-Libre, collection Témoignages, Montpellier, 1980, 293 p.

External links

Geomorphology of the Rhone Delta, Richard Joel Russell, 1942, ANNAL, Association of American Geographers, volume 32, issue 2, pages 149–255 
Office of Tourism of Aigues-Mortes
Aigues-Mortes guide Navigation and mooring information.
Aigues-Mortes Photogallery 
Photos of Aigues Mortes 
Aigues-Mortes on Géoportail, National Geographic Institute (IGN) website 
Aiguesmortes on the 1750 Cassini Map
Aigues-Mortes, John Reps Bastides Collection, Cornell University Library
 on Base Mérimée on Base Mérimée on Base Mérimée on Base Mérimée on Base Mérimée''

Crusade places
Communes of Gard
Monuments of the Centre des monuments nationaux